Silverdale is a minor dale in the Yorkshire Dales in North Yorkshire, England. It is a side dale of Ribblesdale, and lies west of Fountains Fell. The dale head is just south of Pen-y-ghent. The Pennine Way crosses the head of the dale.

A minor road runs through the dale from Stainforth to Halton Gill.  along the road from Stainforth is the site of Neolithic burial ground known as Giants Graves.

References

External links 

Yorkshire Dales
Valleys of North Yorkshire